Lyces fluonia is a moth of the family Notodontidae first described by Herbert Druce in 1885. It is found in the cloud forests of Ecuador and Peru.

Larvae have been reared on Passiflora mollissima.

External links
Species page at Tree of Life Web Project

Notodontidae
Moths described in 1885